Gramin Bhandaran Yojana, or Rural Godown Scheme, is an Indian government initiative to offer subsidies to individuals or organizations which build or repair rural godowns.

Introduction 
The network of rural storage will increase the holding capacity for small farmers, to sell their produce at a reasonable price, not by selling them in thunderstorms. Accordingly, the Rural Storage Scheme was started in 2001-02 under the Capital Investment Subsidy Scheme for the construction / renovation of rural warehouses.

Rural storage scheme capacity 
Capacity under this scheme will be decided by the entrepreneur. But to get the subsidy, the capacity of the warehouse should be minimum 100 tonnes and maximum of 30,000 tonnes. If the capacity is more than 30,000 tonnes or less than 100 tonnes then subsidy will not be given under this scheme. Subsidies will also be provided in some special cases up to 50 tonnes capacity. Subsidy will also be provided to rural warehouses with a capacity of 25 tonnes in hilly areas. The loan repayment period under this scheme is 11 years.

Other agriculture schemes launched by Modi regime 

Agriculture initiatives schemes launched by the Narendra Modi regime are:

 2020 Indian agriculture acts
 Atal Bhujal Yojana
 E-NAM for online agrimarketing
 Gramin Bhandaran Yojana, for local storage
 Micro Irrigation Fund (MIF)
 National Mission For Sustainable Agriculture (NMSA)
 National Scheme on Fisheries Training and Extension
 National Scheme on Welfare of Fishermen
 Pradhan Mantri Kisan Samman Nidhi (PMKSN) for minimum support scheme
 Pradhan Mantri Krishi Sinchai Yojana (PMKSY) for irrigation
 Paramparagat Krishi Vikas Yojana (PKVY) for organic farming
 Pradhan Mantri Fasal Bima Yojana (PMFBY) for crop insurance

See also

 Agriculture in India
 Agricultural insurance in India
 Irrigation in India
 Rashtriya Krishi Vikas Yojana

References 

Modi administration initiatives
Government schemes in India